Physical Thrills is the sixth studio album by American alternative rock band Silversun Pickups. It was released on August 19, 2022, and was their second album to be produced by Butch Vig and their third album to be released on their own label, New Machine Recordings.

Track listing

Personnel 
Silversun Pickups
 Brian Aubert – lead vocals (1–3, 5, 7–13), guitars (1–3, 5, 7–13), bass and additional keyboards (4, 6), backing vocals (6)
 Nikki Monninger – bass (1–3, 5, 7–13), backing vocals (1–3, 5, 7–10, 12–13), lead vocals (4, 6)
 Joe Lester – keyboards, synthesizer, talk box (5), sound manipulation
 Christopher Guanlao – drums, percussion

Additional personnel
 Butch Vig – producer
 Billy Bush – mixing, engineering
 Heba Kadry – mastering
 Mike Fasano – technician
 Lawrence Azerrad – graphic design, art direction
 Claire Marie Vogel – photography

References

External links 
 Physical Thrills

2022 albums
Silversun Pickups albums
Albums produced by Butch Vig